Taleb-e Asfur (also Romanized as Ţāleb-e ʿAṣfūr; also known as Ţāleb-e Aş‘ūr) is a village in Jazireh-ye Minu Rural District, Minu District, Khorramshahr County, Khuzestan Province, Iran. At the 2006 census, its population was 47, in 9 families.

References 

Populated places in Khorramshahr County